A Scream in the Night is a 1919 American silent drama film directed by Leander De Cordova and Burton L. King and starring Ruth Budd, Ralph Kellard and Edna Britton.

Cast
 Ruth Budd as Darwa
 Ralph Kellard as Robert Hunter
 Edna Britton as Vaneva Carter
 John Webb Dillion as Prof. Silvio 
 Edward Roseman as Lotec 
 Stephen Grattan as Sen. Newcastle
 Adelbert Hugo as Floris
 Louis Stern as Mr. Graham

References

Bibliography
 Soister, John T., Nicolella, Henry & Joyce, Steve. American Silent Horror, Science Fiction and Fantasy Feature Films, 1913-1929. McFarland, 2014.

External links
 

1919 films
1919 drama films
1910s English-language films
American silent feature films
Silent American drama films
American black-and-white films
Films directed by Burton L. King
Selznick Pictures films
1910s American films
English-language drama films